Portessie is a small fishing village east of Buckie, on the north-east coast of Scotland. It is commonly nicknamed "the Sloch", due to the name of the original settlement being Rottenslough. The village is sandwiched between Buckie and Findochty, two popular tourist spots.

Portessie is home to Portessie Primary School.

To the west is the March Road Industrial Estate, with a fish processing factory and the home of Cruickshanks, who make soft drinks. Strathlene Golf Club is east of the village, and is split into two fields – containing 14 and 4 holes respectively.

The yearly Peter Fair, or Rathven Market can be attributed to Portessie but is more commonly linked to the community of Buckie as a whole.

To the south of the village is a small community called Rathven which is home to two graveyards.

There is a caravan park at Strathlene.

See also
Portessie railway station

References

Villages in Moray
Buckie